The South Lebanon security belt administration was a Lebanese Christian provisional government body that exercised authority in the Israeli-occupied "Security Zone" of southern Lebanon. It replaced the administrative authority of the State of Free Lebanon, which collapsed in 1984, and operated from 1985 until 2000 with full logistical and military support from Israel. It controlled  of territory in the Security Zone.

During its functioning years, the administration was headed by Antoine Lahad, a Maronite Christian military officer. Lahad's 2,400-strong South Lebanon Army, financed and equipped by Israel and supported by 1,000 Israeli troops, was the official armed force of the Security Zone.

See also

 State of Free Lebanon, a breakaway polity that preceded the security belt administration
 Israeli occupation of Southern Lebanon, 1985–2000 military occupation of parts of Lebanon by Israel
 1985–2000 South Lebanon conflict

References

Politics of Lebanon
Political organisations based in Lebanon
Lebanese nationalism
South Lebanon conflict (1985–2000)